Photuris frontalis is a synchronous-flashing firefly species in the beetle family Lampyridae.

Geography 
Photuris frontalis occurs in isolated, distinct sub-populations and is found across much of the Eastern United States. It is locally abundant in some places, particularly within several State and National Parks where its mating displays are a growing tourist attraction. It can be found from cypress wetlands in Florida, to semi-xeric pine-oak-hickory woodlands in Delaware.

References

Further reading
 

Articles created by Qbugbot
Beetles described in 1852
Photuris